S. crocea may refer to:

 Scorzoneroides crocea, a flowering plant
 Seila crocea, a sea snail
 Sobralia crocea, a flowering plant
 Solorina crocea, a lichenized fungus
 Stenaroa crocea, an owlet moth
 Sychnovalva crocea, a tortrix moth